The Prodigals is an American Irish punk band that started in 1997.

Calling their genre of music "jig punk", the Prodigals fall within a tradition epitomized by the Pogues and Black 47, merging traditional Celtic melodic roots with rock rhythms. As of 2017, the band's lineup features the three original members: Gregory Grene (button accordion and lead vocals), Andrew Harkin (bass), Brian Tracey (drums), plus Galway's Dave Fahy (guitar and lead vocals) who has been a member since 2009. They are frequently joined by Alex Grene, nephew of Gregory, and a graduate in music composition from the University of Chicago. The Prodigals call Paddy Reilly's (the world's only all-draft Guinness bar) their home when in New York City. The band has its own distinctive sound, particularly distinguished by lead melodic roles being filled by button-key accordion and bass along with the vocals, and has received substantial critical notice through the years.

Their songs "Open Reel" and "The Bunch of Red Roses" were played in the film Pride and Glory during the bar fight scene between Edward Norton and Colin Farrell.

The Prodigals band has had many changes to its members over the years.  Here is a listing of ex-Prodigals:
 Alex Tobias - harmonica, fiddle, and vocals
 Sean McCabe - guitar and vocals
 Ray Kelly - guitar and vocals
 Brendan Smith - drums
 Chris Nicolo - drums
 Colm O'Brien - guitar and vocals
 Ed Kollar - Bass
 Eamon Ellams - drums
 Eamon O'Tuama - guitar and vocals

Discography

Albums
 The Prodigals (1997)
 Go On (1999), effectively the band's breakout album
 Dreaming in Hell's Kitchen (2001, produced by Scottish fiddler and record producer Johnny Cunningham)
 Needs Must When the Devil Drives (2003, produced by Howie Beno, who notably also produced the Red Hot Chili Peppers single "Give It Away")
 Beachland Bootleg (2005), a live album/DVD recorded at the Beachland Ballroom in Cleveland, Ohio
 Momentum (2006)
 Whiskey Asylum (2008)
 Brothers (2016)

Solo/acoustic album
 FlipSides (2009)

Contributing artist
 The Rough Guide to Irish Music (1996)

References

External links
 Official Website
 A review of Momentum written for the Folk and Acoustic Music Exchange 
 An interview with Gregory Grene
 Allmusic

Musical groups from New York City
Celtic punk groups
Punk rock groups from New York (state)